On 6 July 2011, a Silk Way Airlines Ilyushin Il-76 cargo aircraft on a flight from Baku, Azerbaijan, to Bagram Air Base in Afghanistan, crashed into a mountainside at an altitude of  while descending at night towards Bagram. All nine people on board were killed.

Despite initial claims by Taliban rebels that they had shot down the aircraft, no evidence was found of external interference, while analysis of the flight recorders suggested the crash was a case of controlled flight into terrain.

Accident
The Il-76 had taken off from Heydar Aliyev International Airport in Baku at 21:26 local time (16:26 UTC) on 5 July, with 18 tonnes of cargo destined for the International Security Assistance Force (ISAF) in Bagram. It was scheduled to land at Bagram at 01:40 local time on 6 July (21:10 on 5 July UTC).

Shortly before arriving at Bagram, the flight disappeared from radar.

No distress call was received from the crew before contact was lost. The same aircraft had recently flown from Kuwait to Baku without any problem.

All nine people on board had perished.

Aircraft
The aircraft involved was an Ilyushin Il-76TD with Azerbaijani registration 4K-AZ55, serial number 2053420680. Built in 2005, it was operated by Silk Way Holding, a company linked to Azerbaijan Airlines. The aircraft received its last full technical inspection in February 2011 and had passed a regular technical inspection one month prior to the crash.

Crew 
Reports on the nationality of the crew varied, with some reporting five Azerbaijanis and four Uzbeks, while others six Azerbaijanis and three Uzbeks. The captain had logged over 4,500 flying hours at the time of the accident.

Aftermath 
Taliban spokesman Zabiullah Mujahid stated that the aircraft had been shot down by Taliban rebels who believed it was carrying a shipment of weapons, but Afghan local authorities denied any Taliban involvement.

Despite ISAF stating that no Taliban activity had been reported in the affected area at the time of the crash, several attempts to reach the crash site were met with gunfire. The Azerbaijani ambassador to Afghanistan and Pakistan considered that reports indicating technical problems with the aircraft were not true, and that in his opinion the Taliban were responsible for its loss.

Silk Way Airlines temporarily halted its operations to Afghanistan following the accident, resuming them on 21 July.

Investigation 
An investigative commission was set up by the Afghanistan Civil Aviation Authority, assisted by Azerbaijani authorities and by Russia's Interstate Aviation Committee (IAC).

On 25 July, the remains of the crew members were delivered to the Association of Forensic Medical Examination and Pathological Anatomy of the Ministry of Health of Azerbaijan in Baku.

On 15 August, the cockpit voice recorder (CVR) was sent to Moscow. Members of the IAC and representatives of Afghanistan, Azerbaijan and Uzbekistan successfully downloaded the recorded information. Analysis of the CVR suggested that at the time of the crash, the aircraft was under the captain's command, and that contrary to normal practice, he was flying visually and without assistance from Bagram air traffic control.

The vice-president of the investigative commission also stated that the aircraft had deviated from the established route.

See also
List of aviation accidents and incidents in the war in Afghanistan
Taliban insurgency

References

External links
Silk Way Airlines
Bagram Airfield

Aviation accidents and incidents in 2011
Aviation accidents and incidents in Afghanistan
Accidents and incidents involving the Ilyushin Il-76
Silk Way Airlines Ilyushin Il-76 crash
July 2011 events in Afghanistan